WJSV is a student-run radio station in Morristown, New Jersey. WJSV is run by students of Morristown High School and owned by the Morris School District. WJSV, first bought by the Morris School District in 1971, generally broadcasts Monday through Friday from 7:30 am to 8:30 pm while school is in session.  WJSV's main transmitter is located at Mountain Way School in Morris Plains, New Jersey.

Currently, the station is completely run by members and an executive staff composed totally of students. The executive staff is mainly an emulation of the above the line positions at a commercial radio station, including Program Director, Music Director, News Director, and Station Manager. Usually the station is supervised only by two staff members, one being the Station Advisor, currently Lance Armstrong, formerly Michael Butler; the other is the Chief Engineer, formerly Steven Woodruff.

Before the station was bought by the Morris School District, Morristown High School had already had a TV station, which upon purchasing WJSV, was renamed JSV-TV. For many years it was used for a weekly show named Colonial Corner. However, in the 2013–2014 school year, Colonial Corner moved to an online-only format, with episodes hosted on YouTube.

Original WJSV (CBS ownership)

WJSV originally came on the air in 1926 as WTRC in Brooklyn, New York then was moved to Arlington, Virginia, the following year and became WJSV in 1928.

CBS bought the station from the previous owner in 1931, officially moved the station to Washington, D.C., although the transmitter site remained in Virginia. CBS made WJSV its affiliate in the nation's capital.

Among the more famous events involving WJSV was the recording of its entire broadcast day on September 21, 1939. The recording includes many famous radio programs of the time (including Amos 'n Andy and Major Bowes' Original Amateur Hour), local programs featuring Arthur Godfrey and John Charles Daly before their national successes, a Cleveland Indians–Washington Senators baseball game, and a speech by President Franklin Roosevelt. The recording was saved in the National Archives and still exists today; many old time radio websites have excerpts of the WJSV broadcast day and offer copies for sale.  A sampling of the material broadcast that day was featured on the 70th anniversary of the event on National Public Radio's All Things Considered of September 21, 2009, also there is a copy of the entire broadcast on the Internet Archive web page .

WJSV changed its call letters to WTOP in 1943; the station is still on the air to this day.

Colonial Corner - (formerly JSV-TV) 
Colonial Corner is Morristown High School's television show which is produced in its entirety by students. Originally airing on Cablevision channel 77 and later over classroom television sets during a one-hour AEP block, Colonial Corner made a switch to a YouTube-only platform in 2010.  Episodes are now produced throughout the school year and are uploaded approximately every three weeks.  The shows generally feature a lineup of "pieces", ranging in subject,  with host segments in between to introduce them.  An opening sequence, bumpers, and credits help to define the show.

References

External links

Complete Broadcast Day - WJSV 9/21/39; Courtesy of The Internet Archive web page
Library of Congress essay on WJSV's full day of broadcasting.

JSV
JSV
Radio stations established in 1939
1939 establishments in New Jersey